The Vermilion River is a tributary of the North Saskatchewan River in east-central Alberta, Canada. Its lower course flows through the County of Vermilion River, which is named after this river. It has been said that this river got its name from the distinctive red clay on the edge of the river banks.

Course
The Vermilion River is formed from spring runoff and rainfall south of the town of Vegreville.  It flows northeast through Vegreville, then continues in that direction until the town of Two Hills, where it turns southeast. At Vermilion, a reservoir is created by a dam on the river.  After that, the river turns again to the northeast.  It empties into the North Saskatchewan River 16 km north of Marwayne.

Vermilion River has a length of 255 km. Before its confluence with the North Saskatchewan River, it has an average water level of 16.5 m.

The Vermilion Provincial Park is established on the banks of the river.

Fishing
The Vermilion River is home to northern pike, fathead minnow, lake chub, brook stickleback (Culaea inconstans), longnose dace and white sucker. This waterway is subject to North Saskatchewan Tributaries fishing regulations

See also 
 List of rivers of Alberta

References

Rivers of Alberta
North Saskatchewan River